Yin Yicui (born January 1955) is a Chinese Communist Party politician who previously served as the Chairwoman of the Shanghai People's Congress from 2013 to 2020.

Career
Yin was born in Cangnan County, Zhejiang province. She began her career as a teenager in a food processing factory in Jing'an District, where she joined the Communist Youth League. Yin is a graduate of East China Normal University, where she received her bachelor's degree in 1982 and master's degree in 1995. After graduating she stayed at the school to be a political instructor and lecturer. 

In 1992 she was named deputy governor of Jing'an District, then in 1994 she was appointed deputy head of the municipal office of education and health (department-level). She entered government in 1997, then rose to the municipal Party Standing Committee in 1997, then head of propaganda in Shanghai in 2000. In May 2000 she became the Deputy Communist Party Secretary of Shanghai; she spent over a decade in the position. Finally she was promoted to Chair of the Shanghai Municipal People's Congress in April 2013. She was succeeded in her deputy party chief post by Li Xi.

References 

1955 births
Living people
Alternate members of the 16th Central Committee of the Chinese Communist Party
Alternate members of the 17th Central Committee of the Chinese Communist Party
Chinese Communist Party politicians from Zhejiang
Chinese women in politics
East China Normal University alumni
Members of the Standing Committee of the 13th National People's Congress
People's Republic of China politicians from Zhejiang
Political office-holders in Shanghai